Ternay is a commune of the Loir-et-Cher department in central France. It is mentioned by Gregory of Tours.

Population

See also
Communes of the Loir-et-Cher department

References

Communes of Loir-et-Cher